Kain Bond (born 19 June 1985) is an English former professional footballer.

Bond was born in Torquay and grew up in the Chelston district of the town. He  joined the Torquay United Centre of Excellence, and became a prolific scorer for the Gulls' Under-16 side. He signed on as a trainee at Plainmoor in July 2001 and made his league debut on 12 October 2002 as a substitute for Paul Holmes in a 2–1 defeat away to Boston United. He played one further game that season, again as a substitute, this time for David Graham in the 5–0 home win in the FA Cup against Boreham Wood.

He turned professional in May 2003, but played just once the following season, as a late substitute for Alex Russell in a 4–0 defeat away to Boston United on 25 October. Torquay's form that season was enough to win them promotion, but the form of Bond's teammates and a series of injuries kept him out of the side. He was given a short-term contract in the 2004 close season by Torquay manager Leroy Rosenior, making two further substitute appearances that September before being released in the November.

On leaving Torquay he played for Taunton Town. Bond joined Torrington in December 2005. As of 2012 he plays for Buckland Athletic Reserves.

Personal life
His brother Clay was also a footballer, playing for Torquay, and Plymouth Argyle, as well as in Sweden and Spain.

References

External links

1985 births
Sportspeople from Torquay
Living people
English footballers
Torquay United F.C. players
Taunton Town F.C. players
Torrington F.C. players
Buckland Athletic F.C. players
Association football forwards